Muleshoe National Wildlife Refuge is a  wildlife refuge located about  south of Muleshoe, Texas, on Texas State Highway 214. It is the oldest national wildlife refuge in  Texas, having been established as the Muleshoe Migratory Waterfowl Refuge by executive order of President Franklin D. Roosevelt in 1935. Roosevelt issued a proclamation in 1940 to change the name to the Muleshoe National Wildlife Refuge. In 1980, Muleshoe National Wildlife Refuge was designated as a National Natural Landmark by the National Park Service.

The refuge is a stop for migratory waterfowl flying between Canada and Mexico. The refuge includes several intermittent salt lakes, some of which have been modified to extend their wet periods. Paul's Lake, on the east side of Highway 214, is spring-fed, and hosts wildlife during times when the other lakes are dry. If sufficient water is present during the winter, the refuge hosts tens of thousands of sandhill cranes. The largest number of cranes ever recorded was 250,000, during February, 1981.

Other wildlife includes wood warblers, meadowlarks, raptors, burrowing owls, black-tailed prairie dogs, jackrabbits, cottontail rabbits, coyotes, black-footed ferrets, spotted chorus frogs, and badgers.

The prairie ecosystem includes plant life such as wildflowers, grasses, yucca, cacti, and mesquite.  Rangeland management techniques include controlled burning and grazing.

Northeast of White Lake is a small area of white gypsum dunes, similar to those found at White Sands National Park in New Mexico, though these are much less expansive.

See also
Grulla National Wildlife Refuge
Buffalo Lake National Wildlife Refuge
Blackwater Draw
Llano Estacado

References

External links

Muleshoe National Wildlife Refuge Official Site
Handbook of Texas Online: Muleshoe National Wildlife Refuge
Public domain images of the Llano Estacado

National Wildlife Refuges in Texas
National Natural Landmarks in Texas
Protected areas of Bailey County, Texas
Protected areas established in 1935
1935 establishments in Texas